Chilote School of Religious Imagery ——, is an artistic and cultural manifestation that was developed during the 17th century on the basis of the circular movement of evangelizing established by the Jesuit missionaries, and reaches its climax in the late 19th century.

Its character of "school" lies in that these sculptures shape a "type" that altered the typical archetypal of American and Spanish Baroque imagery; as a product of cultural syncretism and miscegenation, the works of this school was developed locally and are characterized by the combination and adaptation of European, Latin American and Indigenous features. This artistic expression differs from peninsular, quiteña or cuzqueña artistic production: it can appreciate remarkable differences in technique, materials and style.

References 

History of Chiloé
Chilean art
Religion in Chiloé
Mestizo art